Leeson House is a field studies centre in the village of Langton Matravers in the heart of the Isle of Purbeck, Dorset, England. The Isle of Purbeck forms part of the Jurassic Coast World Heritage Site, designated in 2001. Run as a day and residential centre by Dorset County Council Outdoor Education Service it has been providing environmental education since 1966.

History 

There has probably been a dwelling of some sort on or near the site of the present house since Saxon times. The site was recorded in the Domesday book as 'Lestington', meaning "the farm of the followers of Lest". In 1805 Reverend John Dampier knocked down most of the farmhouse and built a new home, calling it Leeson house. He later sold it to the wealthy Garland family from Poole to use as a second home. In 1903, it was sold again and became a boarding school for girls. In 1940, the girls were sent home during World War II. The house was taken over by the Air Ministry and was used for top secret Radar research. From Leeson they completed the world's first successful tracking of a submarine, in Swanage Bay. Due to concerns about the safety of the project it was moved inland after only 18 months. Several air raid shelters still exist on site. There is a project to convert a bomb shelter to attract the Greater Horseshoe Bat to roost. After the war it became a boy's boarding pre-prep school which closed in 1966. In 1967 Leeson House was officially opened as a Field Studies Centre.

Facilities 

The main house is Grade II listed and dates back to the early 19th century. It provides accommodation for up to 60 students plus staff, two dining rooms, two lounges, games/conference hall, changing room/drying room and a separate teaching block with fully equipped field laboratory, a library and two classrooms. The centre has seven acres of private grounds that contain a wide variety of habitats including three ponds, meadows and woodland areas. There is also a bird hide, games field and a small campsite. Deer and badgers are frequent visitors to the grounds and a healthy population of newts reside in the ponds.

Activities 

Leeson House runs field study and outdoor education courses for pupils between reception to A level, offering activities tailored for each school.

References

External links
 Leeson House
  Jurassic Coast

1966 establishments in the United Kingdom
Education in Dorset
Country houses in Dorset
Isle of Purbeck
Field studies centres in the United Kingdom